Eduardo Casas-Alvero (born 1948) is a Spanish mathematician and a professor at the University of Barcelona. His work lies in algebraic geometry and commutative algebra, especially curve theory. One of his main contributions has been the Casas-Alvero conjecture characterizing certain polynomials whose factors match their derivatives as powers of a linear polynomial.

Bibliography
Casas-Alvero, E. and Xambo-Descamps, S. (1986). The Enumerative Theory of Conics After Halphen. Lecture Notes in Mathematics. Springer.
Casas-Alvero, E. (2000). Singularities of Plane Curves. London Mathematical Society Lecture Note Series. Cambridge University Press.
Casas-Alvero, E. (2014). Analytic Projective Geometry. EMS Textbooks in Mathematics. European Mathematical Society.
Casas-Alvero, E. (2019). Algebraic Curves, the Brill and Noether Way. Universitext. Springer.

References

External links
 
 Casas-Alvero's page from the University of Barcelona directory

1948 births
Living people
20th-century Spanish mathematicians
Algebraic geometers
21st-century Spanish mathematicians